Andrei Nikolayevich Zakharenko (born 18 March 1979) is a former Russian professional footballer. He spent most of his career in FC Metallurg Lipetsk.

External links
 
 

1979 births
Sportspeople from Lipetsk
Living people
Russian footballers
Association football defenders
Russian expatriate footballers
Expatriate footballers in Finland
Expatriate footballers in Belarus
FC Metallurg Lipetsk players
FC Torpedo-BelAZ Zhodino players
Belarusian Premier League players